"Initiation" is the fifth episode of the third season of the American version of The Office, and the show's 33rd overall. In the episode, Ryan Howard (B. J. Novak) is taken by Dwight Schrute (Rainn Wilson) on what he believes is a sales call, but instead is brought to Dwight's beet farm for an "initiation." Pam Beesly (Jenna Fischer) is supposed to keep track of Michael Scott's (Steve Carell) productivity, but Michael spends his day waiting in line for a pretzel. Jim Halpert (John Krasinski) steals Karen Filippelli's (Rashida Jones) chair and foils her attempts to get it back.

Written by B. J. Novak and directed by Randall Einhorn, the episode first aired in the United States on October 19, 2006, on NBC. Upon its debut, "Initiation" was seen by an estimated 8.46 million viewers according to Nielsen Media Research. It was positively received by television critics.

Plot
Ryan Howard (B. J. Novak) plans to go on his first sales call with Dwight Schrute (Rainn Wilson). Dwight instead takes Ryan to his beet farm to both teach and haze him. When Ryan, a member of a fraternity in college, accuses him of trying to haze him into acceptance, Dwight snaps at him, saying the reason Ryan has yet to make a sale is because he thinks he knows everything, and must think otherwise to sell. After Dwight tries to force Ryan to wrestle his cousin Mose (Michael Schur), Ryan gets angry and walks out. Dwight apologizes to Ryan and begins to give Ryan serious sales advice as Ryan takes notes. The two then go on a sales call which ultimately does not work out for Ryan. Irritated, Ryan throws eggs at the building housing the company that refused his sale, with Dwight joining him. Dwight and Ryan then go to a bar and return to the office, where it appears they formed a new bond.

Jan Levinson (Melora Hardin) instructs receptionist Pam Beesly (Jenna Fischer) to keep a log of Michael Scott's (Steve Carell) activity, and throughout the day, she dryly notes Michael's antics, including a Bill Cosby impression for a potential customer and waiting in line with Stanley Hudson (Leslie David Baker) for a free soft pretzel, while hinting to Michael that he should focus on being productive. Michael enjoys Gary Glitter's "Rock and Roll" in his office at a high volume. After consuming his sugary pretzel, Michael emerges from his office and launches into a hyperactive, sugar-fueled speech before falling asleep at his desk. At the end of the day, Pam realizes that Michael's antics secured a large sale.

At Dunder Mifflin's Stamford branch, Karen Filippelli (Rashida Jones) discovers that Jim Halpert (John Krasinski) swapped his chair for hers, but Jim foils her efforts to switch them back. The two flirt for a while before Karen steals Andy Bernard's (Ed Helms) chair. Later that night, Jim, who was trying to call Kevin Malone (Brian Baumgartner), ends up talking to Pam on the phone for the first time since the two kissed. The two have a lengthy conversation and begin to reconnect.  Jim misinterprets Pam's parting phrase to Ryan as being directed at him, and the two end their conversation, much to their sadness. The episode ends with a brief talking head of Stanley, counting down the days left in the year until the next Pretzel day.

Production
This episode was the first full episode of the series directed by Randall Einhorn, and also the first time Einhorn had ever directed any episode of a TV show. Einhorn had previously directed all ten webisodes of the spin-off mini-series "The Accountants". "Initiation" was written by B. J. Novak, who also acts for the show as Ryan Howard.

The episode aired after "Grief Counseling", but was filmed before it due to the availability of the beet farm location. Although the idea for writer Michael Schur to be Dwight's cousin Mose had been a joke among the writers since the first season, B. J. Novak pitched the idea when writing "Initiation". In preparation for the episode, Schur grew out his beard for three months. On the days of the shoot, he also wore wool clothes, which was uncomfortable given the high temperatures outside. Mose was based on an actual participant in the UPN reality show Amish in the City. The episode partially filmed on a ranch owned by Disney, and the production was required to have a professional snake wrangler on site due to the potential for rattlesnake visits to the area.

The third season DVD contains a number of deleted scenes from the episode, including Jan asking Michael to record his day on a schedule, Ryan being hugged by Michael before leaving for his first sales call, Dwight and Ryan leaving the office, Michael reading his schedule in a talking head scene, Pam encouraging Michael to "focus" for the day, Ryan reflecting on his life path, and Dwight showing Ryan his family cemetery and making a reference to his Nazi grandfather by calling him "a good man...who did some VERY bad things".

Reception
"Initiation" first aired on October 19, 2006, in the United States on NBC. According to Nielsen Media Research, the episode was watched by an estimated 8.46 million viewers.

This episode was generally well received by critics. Abby West of Entertainment Weekly stated that "one of the many things I love about the show is how current it is. I love the pop-culture references, like Lost'''s Dharma Initiative, Deal or No Deal, and that soon-to-be classic SNL/Chronicles of Narnia'' sketch. IGN's Brian Zoromski said that although the episode had "a few hit and miss moments", it "was a very well done episode that carried through on three main storylines" and "began and ended beautifully". A critic from eTV Review said that even if it "wasn’t as good as last week’s episode", it was still "another great one".

References

External links
"Initiation" at NBC.com

Initiation
2006 American television episodes